Arshdeep Singh (born 7 May 1994) is an Indian professional footballer who plays as a forward for Minerva Punjab F.C. in the I-League.

Career

Minerva Punjab F.C

Career statistics

References
"City lad in Kashmir FC," The tribune , 24-Jul-2020. [Online]. Available: www.google.com.in/amp/s/www.tribuneindia.com/news/chandigarh/city-lad-in-kashmir-fc-117143. [Accessed: 18-Dec-2020]

External links

1994 births
Living people
Indian footballers
Association football forwards
RoundGlass Punjab FC players
I-League players
Footballers from Chandigarh